The 2014–15 Segunda Liga was the 25th season of the second-tier of football in Portugal. A total of 24 teams played in the league.

Events
Atlético CP stayed in the 2014–15 Segunda Liga after being invited by the Portuguese League for Professional Football (LPFP) as the 2014–15 Primeira Liga competition was expanded to 18 teams, because Boavista was reintegrated, along with the expansion of the 2014–15 Segunda Liga competition to 24 teams and also to the impossibility of a 4th place club from the 2013–14 Campeonato Nacional de Seniores to be promoted.

Teams

Stadia and locations

Managerial changes

League table

Positions by round

Results

Statistics

Top scorers

Sources: LPFP, Zerozero

Hat-tricks

Note
1 Player scored 4 goals

Awards

Monthly awards

SJPF Segunda Liga Player of the Month

SJPF Segunda Liga Young Player of the Month

See also 
 2014–15 Primeira Liga
 2014–15 Campeonato Nacional
 2014–15 Taça de Portugal
 2014–15 Taça da Liga

References 

Liga Portugal 2 seasons
2
Por